The Young Victoria is a 2009 period drama film directed by Jean-Marc Vallée and written by Julian Fellowes. It centered on the early life and reign of Queen Victoria, including her relationship with her husband, Prince Albert. The film starred Emily Blunt and Rupert Friend among a large ensemble cast. Martin Scorsese, Graham King, and Sarah, Duchess of York served as its producers. A GK Films production, The Young Victoria was distributed by Momentum Pictures in the United Kingdom and by Apparition in the United States. Its world premiere was held on 5 February 2009 at the 59th Berlin International Film Festival while its UK premiere was held in London's Leicester Square on 3 March. The film was screened throughout 2009 and early 2010 at film festivals in Toronto, Sudbury, Ontario, Chicago, Hamptons, New York, Vermont, San Francisco, Denver, and San Joaquin, California. The Young Victorias theatrical release occurred on 6 March 2009 in the UK; it was released in a limited capacity in the US on 18 December 2009, and opened nationwide on Christmas Day. It earned a worldwide gross of $27,409,889.

Vallée's movie garnered various awards and nominations following its release, with most nominations recognizing its costume design and Blunt's acting performance. The Young Victoria received three Academy Awards nominations; the ceremony saw costume designer Sandy Powell win her third Academy Award for Best Costume Design. At the 63rd British Academy Film Awards, The Young Victoria won both of its award categories, giving Powell and makeup artist Jenny Shircore their second BAFTAs, respectively. Powell won in nearly every category she received a nomination for. Following the Academy Awards and BAFTAs, she was nominated at four other major award shows, ultimately winning the Broadcast Film Critics Association Award for Best Costume Design, and the Costume Designers Guild Award for Excellence in Period Film.

Blunt received eight acting nominations at various award shows, including the British Independent Film Awards, the Broadcast Film Critics Association Awards, and the Empire Awards. Her only major acting accolade was received at the Vancouver Film Critics Circle Awards, where she won the Award for Best Actress in a Canadian Film. The Young Victoria won for Best Romance at the Golden Trailer Awards, and achieved the Audience Award at the Hamptons International Film Festival and at the Cinéfest Sudbury International Film Festival. In addition, The Sydney Morning Herald included The Young Victoria on its list of the top ten best films of 2009, giving it the highest ranking.

Accolades

See also

 Cultural depictions of Queen Victoria
 2009 in film

References
General

Specific

External links
 

Lists of accolades by film